Rodney Lee Davis (born January 5, 1970) is an American Republican politician who served as the U.S. representative for Illinois's 13th congressional district from 2013 to 2023. Davis's tenure ended when redistricting led to a primary race in the Illinois's 15th against fellow incumbent Mary Miller.

Early life and education
Davis was born in Des Moines, Iowa. He graduated from Millikin University in 1992 with a degree in political science.

Early political career
In 1996, he lost a race for the state legislature. In 1998, Davis managed Illinois Congressman John Shimkus's first reelection campaign. After the successful campaign, he accepted a position on Shimkus's congressional staff.

In 2000, Davis lost his campaign for mayor of Taylorville, Illinois. Davis served as Shimkus's projects director while running for Congress.

U.S. House of Representatives

Elections

2012

On May 19, 2012, the Republican County Chairmen for the 14 Illinois counties the 13th district comprises nominated Davis as the Republican candidate for Congress. This district had previously been the 15th, represented by six-term incumbent Republican Tim Johnson. Johnson had announced in April that he would not seek reelection, just days after winning the Republican primary. Other finalists for the nomination were Jerry Clarke, chief of staff to fellow U.S. Representative Randy Hultgren and Johnson's former chief of staff; Erika Harold, a lawyer and winner of Miss America in 2003; and Kathy Wassink, a businesswoman. Davis was coaching his sons' little league baseball game when he was informed that he had been nominated. His home in Taylorville had previously been in Shimkus's 19th District (which had been renumbered as the 15th). But the new 13th had absorbed much of the old 19th's northern portion, including Taylorville.

In the general election, Davis defeated Democratic nominee David M. Gill by 1,002 votes (0.3%). Independent candidate John Hartman received around 21,000 votes (7.2%).

2014

On June 13, 2013, former Miss America Erika Harold announced she would run against Davis in the March 18 Republican primary.

The Republican field included Davis, Harold, and Michael Firsching. Davis won the primary with 55% of the vote.

Davis faced Democratic nominee Ann Callis in the November 4 general election. He was reportedly a top target for the Democrats but won with 59% of the vote.

2016

Davis was reelected in 2016, defeating Ethan Vandersand in the primary and Democratic nominee Mark Wicklund and independent David Gill in the general election. He received 59.7% of the vote.

2018

On March 20, 2018, Betsy Londrigan won the Democratic primary in District 13 with over 45% of the vote, beating Erik Jones, David Gill, Jonathan Ebel, and Angel Sides.

In May 2018, the American Federation of Government Employees endorsed Davis for reelection. AFGE District 7 National Vice President Dorothy James said, "We hope that Representative Davis will continue his good work on Capitol Hill for years to come and are happy to announce our support for him today."

On November 6, Davis was reelected, 50.4% to 49.6%. He lost the district's shares of Champaign, McLean, and Sangamon Counties, but carried Christian and Macon Counties. His margins in both far exceeded his overall margin of 2,058 votes.

During a debate, Davis said that The Washington Post fact-checker had found Londrigan's claims about the impact of Obamacare's repeal on preexisting conditions to be false. The Washington Post fact-checker responded, "Republicans are twisting an unrelated fact check and are misleading voters."

2020

Davis ran for a fifth term and was unopposed in the Republican primary. Londrigan ran again, and easily won the Democratic primary. Although most forecasters considered the race a tossup due to the close margin in 2018, Davis won reelection by 9 points. His larger margin of victory was attributed to both an increase in turnout from the district's Republican-leaning rural counties, and a decrease in the district's college campuses. Londrigan attempted to tie Davis to President Trump, and he linked her to Illinois House Speaker and state Democratic Party chair Mike Madigan, who was broadly unpopular.

Trump's 2020 presidential campaign named Davis one of four "honorary state chairs."

2022

After the 2020 United States census, Illinois Democratic legislators gerrymandered new congressional maps that eliminated Republican-leaning districts. Davis ran unsuccessfully in the 15th district against Congresswoman Mary Miller, even though his home was drawn into the district and Miller's was drawn outside of it.

Tenure
On June 14, 2017, Davis was one of several Republicans who were practicing for the Congressional Baseball Game for Charity at a baseball field in Alexandria, Virginia, when a gunman opened fire, attempting to assassinate Republican members of Congress. Representative Steve Scalise and several others were injured, but due to the heroic actions of Capitol Police Officers David Bailey and Crystal Griner and the Alexandria Police Department, no members of Congress died that day. Since the shooting, Davis has made it his mission to promote more civility in politics.

Since 2019, the Lugar Center and Georgetown University McCourt School of Public Policy’s Bipartisan Index has rated Davis the most bipartisan member of Congress from Illinois. For the First Session (2021) of the 117th Congress, he was rated the 22nd most bipartisan member of Congress nationwide. In the 116th Congress (2019-2020), he was rated the 14th most bipartisan member of Congress nationwide.

Davis introduced the Hire More Heroes Act of 2013 into the House on November 13, 2013. The bill would allow employers to exclude veterans receiving health insurance from the United States Department of Defense or the United States Department of Veterans' Affairs from their list of employees. This would have kept their list of employees shorter, allowing some small businesses to fall underneath the 50 full-time employees line that would require them to provide their employees with healthcare under the Affordable Care Act. Davis said that the bill "gives our small businesses another incentive to hire veterans, which helps to address the increasing number of unemployed veterans, while providing them with some relief from Obamacare."

Davis voted to repeal the Affordable Care Act. He voted to reauthorize the Violence Against Women Act.

Davis voted for H.J.Res.59 – Continuing Appropriations Resolution, 2014, which resulted in the government shutdown of 2013. After the vote, Politico reported that Davis also intended to vote for a bill that would end the shutdown, stressing that an agreement needed to be made and that "Like most of those I represent, I remain opposed to Obamacare, but a government shutdown is absolutely unacceptable."

Davis voted to lift a ban on travel to Cuba. In June 2016, he cast the deciding vote on a bill to continue to allow undocumented immigrants brought to the U.S. as children to join the U.S. military. The program would give those who serve a quicker pathway to citizenship.

During the 115th Congress, Davis was a member of the Republican Main Street Partnership and chaired the Republican Main Street Caucus.

During the presidency of Donald Trump, Davis voted in line with Trump's stated position 88.8% of the time. As of September 2021, Davis had voted in line with Joe Biden's stated position 25.7% of the time.

On May 4, 2017, Davis voted again to repeal the Affordable Care Act and pass the American Health Care Act (AHCA).

Davis voted for the Tax Cuts and Jobs Act of 2017. He said the bill would improve the economy without increasing the deficit, and that Americans would see "more money in the pockets" by February 2018 as a result of the bill.

In June 2018, Davis said, "we've got to stop this politicizing everything like dinner", adding, "Donald Trump was elected, in my opinion, because of this move toward making everything politically correct in this country."

On December 18, 2019, Davis voted against both articles of impeachment against Trump.

On January 6, 2021, Davis was at the U.S. Capitol to certify the Electoral College vote count when Trump supporters stormed the building. Davis and his staff went into hiding under police lockdown for over four hours during the attack. After the Capitol was secure and Congress resumed session, Davis certified the election without objection. As a result of the attack, Trump was impeached a second time. Davis voted against impeachment, saying, "there must be accountability for leaders who deliberately misled the public, but I fear that without thoughtful and clear-eyed leadership from both sides of the aisle, we are in danger of further violence and political unrest." In the wake of the attack, metal detectors were placed outside the House chamber. Davis objected to them.

On May 19, 2021, Davis was one of 35 Republicans who joined all Democrats in voting to approve legislation to establish the January 6 commission meant to investigate the storming of the U.S. Capitol.

In July 2021, Davis was among five Republicans Minority Leader Kevin McCarthy selected to serve on the Select Committee on the January 6 Attack on the Capitol. After Speaker Nancy Pelosi rejected two of the selections, McCarthy pulled all five, including Davis.

In November 2021, Davis voted against censuring Paul Gosar, a House member who had shared an animated video of himself killing a fellow member of Congress and assaulting the president. When a majority of the House voted to censure Gosar, Davis criticized Pelosi, saying she had "torn the fabric of this House apart".

Committee memberships
Committee on Agriculture
Subcommittee on Biotechnology, Horticulture, and Research
Subcommittee on Commodity Exchanges, Energy, and Credit
Committee on House Administration
Committee on Transportation and Infrastructure
Subcommittee on Highways and Transit
Subcommittee on Railroads, Pipelines, and Hazardous Materials

Caucus memberships
Climate Solutions Caucus'''
Republican Governance Group
Veterinary Medicine Caucus

Political positions

Defense 
Davis has worked to promote America’s national security through the National Defense Authorization Act (NDAA). He served on the conference committee for the 2021 NDAA. Davis has worked to promote Scott Air Force Base. He successfully included language in the House version of the 2023 NDAA to protect the C-40C aircraft and the 932nd Airlift Wing flying mission at Scott AFB.

Davis successfully passed his Counting All Military Votes Act, which ensures all active-duty and deployed military personnel who wish to vote have their ballots mailed to their clerks in a timely manner. Davis also successfully passed the Fallen Heroes Family Travel Act, which reimburses travel costs for families of servicemembers who lose their lives in the line of duty who are traveling to obtain their loved ones' remains.

Transportation 
Davis serves on the House Committee on Transportation and Infrastructure (T&I), where he is the Ranking Member of the Subcommittee on Highways and Transit. On T&I, he has advocated for a return to normal, long-term reauthorizations for our transportation systems, including highway, aviation, rail, and waterways.

Reauthorizations Davis has worked on include the 2014, 2016, 2018, 2020, and 2022 Water Resources Development Acts (WRDA), the 2015 Surface Reauthorization bill (FAST Act), and the 2018 FAA Reauthorization. He also served on the conference committee for the 2014 WRDA.

Davis has successfully advocated for regulatory reforms to speed up federal highway projects, including through his One Federal Decision Act, which was signed into law through the Infrastructure Investment and Jobs Act. He also passed the Small Community Transit Improvement Act to help secure additional federal transit dollars for downstate Illinois communities that rely on transit systems.

Agriculture 
Davis is a senior member of the House Agriculture Committee, where he has worked to strengthen farm programs and increase federal support for agricultural research.

Davis helped write the previous two farm bills, serving on the 2014 and 2018 Farm Bill conference committees. In the 2014 Farm Bill, Davis was a leading voice for allowing farmers to choose between the Agriculture Risk Coverage (ARC) and Price Loss Coverage (PLC) risk management programs. In the 2018 Farm Bill, Davis successfully included language to ensure federal agricultural research dollars are directed to programs that positively impact producers.

Davis has consistently supported increased federal agricultural research funding, which has increased by $109 million since 2014.

Student debt 
Davis successfully passed into law his Employer Participation in Repayment Act, which creates a unique public-private partnership to tackle the student debt crisis. The law allows employers to make tax-free student loan payments on behalf of their employees, up to $5,250 per year, through 2025. This program works just like what is already permitted for tuition assistance benefits under Section 127 of the Internal Revenue Code.

Cannabis
Davis has a "B" rating from NORML for his voting record on cannabis-related causes. He supports veterans having access to medical marijuana if recommended by their Veterans Health Administration doctor and if it is legal for medicinal purposes in their state. He supports industrial hemp farming and medical marijuana research.

Economy
In April 2018, Davis expressed concern about the impact of proposed tariffs on Illinois soybean farmers and other Illinois agricultural workers, but was glad that Trump had given Agriculture Secretary Sonny Perdue "a lot of free rein". Davis highlighted unfair Chinese trade practices and noted the adverse effect on the domestic steel industry. In June, he reiterated concern about some of Trump's proposed tariffs' impact on his constituents as well as their impact on certain foreign countries. Although he felt "the president was right to actually address the steel discrepancy that he saw from countries like China", he wished that Trump "would focus on...actors like China rather than punishing our allies".

Gun policy
In March 2018, in the wake of the Stoneman Douglas High School shooting, Davis said the shooting could have been prevented if the perpetrator had been charged with a felony for bringing a gun to school earlier. Davis said he believed more funding should be directed to mental health programs and that loopholes in background checks should be closed, but that he did not see banning guns as a solution.

Immigration
In June 2018, Davis said he hoped to co-sponsor a bill that would address the separation of adult illegal immigrants at the Mexican border from the children accompanying them. He expressed optimism that Congress could come up with a compromise on the issue.

In 2021, Davis voted for the Farm Workforce Modernization Act of 2021, which passes work visas for farm workers.

Davis supports DACA.

Davis voted for the Further Consolidated Appropriations Act of 2020, which authorizes DHS to nearly double the available H-2B visas for the remainder of FY 2020.

Davis voted for the Consolidated Appropriations Act (H.R. 1158), which effectively prohibits Immigration and Customs Enforcement from cooperating with the Department of Health and Human Services to detain or remove illegal alien sponsors of Unaccompanied Alien Children.

Abortion
Davis opposes abortion except in cases of rape or incest or to protect the health of the mother.

Foreign policy
Davis was one of 129 House Republicans who voted to condemn President Donald Trump's withdrawal from Syria.

In 2021, Davis voted against the repeal of the 2002 Authorization of Military Force against Iraq.

Vaccination
Davis voted for the Immunization Infrastructure Modernization Act of 2021. The bill helps create confidential, population-based databases that maintain a record of vaccine administrations.

LGBT rights
In 2019 and in 2021, Davis voted against the Equality Act.

In 2015, Davis was one of 60 Republicans voting to uphold President Barack Obama’s 2014 executive order banning federal contractors from making hiring decisions that discriminate based on sexual orientation or gender identity.

In 2016, Davis was one of 43 Republicans to vote for the Maloney Amendment to H.R. 5055, which would prohibit the use of funds for government contractors who discriminate against LGBT employees.

In 2021, Davis was one of 29 Republicans to vote to reauthorize the Violence Against Women Act. This bill expanded legal protections for transgender people, and contained provisions allowing transgender women to use women's shelters and serve time in prisons matching their gender identity.

In 2021, Davis was one of 33 Republicans to vote for the LGBTQ Business Equal Credit Enforcement and Investment Act.

On July 19, 2022, Davis and 46 other Republican Representatives voted for the Respect for Marriage Act, which would codify the right to same-sex marriage in federal law.

Electoral history

Personal life
Davis and his wife Shannon wed in 1995, and live in Taylorville, Illinois. They have three children.

Davis coached Taylorville Junior Football, is a member of the Taylorville Optimist Club, and serves on the Christian County Senior Center's board of directors. He plays catcher for the GOP team in the Congressional Baseball Game.

After leaving Congress, Davis joined Cozen O'Connor Public Strategies.

References

External links

 
 
 

|-

|-

1970 births
21st-century American politicians
Candidates in the 1996 United States elections
Candidates in the 2000 United States elections
Living people
Millikin University alumni
People from Taylorville, Illinois
Political campaign staff
Politicians from Des Moines, Iowa
Republican Party members of the United States House of Representatives from Illinois
United States congressional aides